Stenocoris tipuloides, the neotropical rice bug, is a species of broad-headed bug in the family Alydidae. It is found in South America and North America.

References

Further reading

 

Articles created by Qbugbot
Insects described in 1773
Hemiptera of South America
Alydinae
Taxa named by Charles De Geer